ξ Gruis, Latinised as Xi Gruis, is a solitary star in the southern constellation of Grus, near the constellation border with Microscopium. It is visible to the naked eye as a dim, orange-hued star with an apparent visual magnitude of 5.3. The star is located about 430 light-years distant from the Sun, based on parallax, but is drifting closer with a radial velocity of −10 km/s.

This is an evolved giant star with a stellar classification of K0 III, having exhausted the supply of hydrogen at its core then cooled and expanded.

References

K-type giants
Grus (constellation)
Gruis, Xi
Durchmusterung objects
106327
204783
8229